"Killer Queen" is the sixteenth episode of the tenth season of the animated comedy series Family Guy. It originally aired on Fox in the United States on March 11, 2012. When Peter and Chris go away to fat camp, they cross paths with a serial killer who targets overweight teens. Meanwhile, Stewie is traumatized by the cover of the 1977 Queen album News of the World. The title of the episode is based on the Queen song of the same name which plays during the end credits.

This episode was written by Spencer Porter and directed by Joseph Lee. It features the guest performances of H. Jon Benjamin, Jackson Douglas, Christine Lakin, Jeff Ross, Eddie Kaye Thomas, Oliver Vaquer, and Robert Wu, along with several recurring voice actors for the series. The episode received fairly positive reviews from critics.

Plot 
Peter and Chris learn of a local hot dog eating contest on the local news, so Peter enters Chris in it. While Peter and Chris try to find an old possession in the attic for $50, the amount Chris needs to enter the contest, Brian comes across News of the World, the 1977 Queen album. Stewie is immediately frightened of the giant robot on the album that is pictured just having killed the members of Queen, so Brian pays Peter and Chris $50 for the album to be able to mess with Stewie's head. But when Stewie attempts suicide, Brian proves to him that it is just an album and convinces him that "most" of Queen are fine today.

At the contest, Chris eats 41 hot dogs, beating worldwide hot dog eating champion Charles Yamamoto. Chris starts feeling stomach pains soon after, and Peter and Lois decide to enroll him in a fat camp called Camp Fresh Start. While hiking, Peter and Chris discover the dead body of an obese teenager. When Joe brings up that the young man was murdered, everyone turns to see Jason Voorhees, but he reveals he is just there to sign up his son. Joe notices that the victim was strangled, leading Peter to think that the killer was his brother-in-law Patrick Pewterschmidt. The family think it to be impossible as Patrick is still at the mental institution, but he soon appears at the Griffin house. However, after Peter and Joe rush to the house, Patrick reveals that he's not the killer and that someone opened his prison cell door days earlier. This statement is later proven when another obese teenager is found murdered while Patrick was not there. Peter and Joe have an idea to catch the real killer by bringing Patrick along, and he quickly reveals that the killer is really after Chris and the two other victims were killed by mistake due to coincidental similarities.

By that time, while sleeping back at home, Chris is attacked by the real killer: none other than Charles Yamamoto, who wants revenge for Chris beating him in the hot dog eating contest. Just as Yamamoto is about to finish off Chris, Stewie appears and shows Yamamoto the News of the World album, causing him to die of a heart attack (a reference to the album Sheer Heart Attack featuring "Killer Queen", and song "Sheer Heart Attack" on the News of the World album) while wondering if the picture was a vision of the past or future. Police arrive at the house where Patrick points out that the dead Yamamoto is the man who released him, revealing the killer's plan to use Patrick as a scapegoat. But when Patrick disappears just as he is about to apologize to him, Joe has Peter injure him to make it look like Patrick escaped his custody.

The aforementioned "Killer Queen" plays as the credits roll.

Production and development 
This episode was written by Spencer Porter and directed by Joseph Lee, during the course of the eleventh production season. The episode marks the return of Lois's mentally-ill brother, Patrick Pewterschmidt. However, Robert Downey Jr. did not reprise the role of Patrick Pewterschmidt, possibly due to his heavy filming schedule at the time. Instead, voice actor Oliver Vaquer took the role. This episode also featured a cameo appearance from Barry Robinson from American Dad!, another show created by Seth MacFarlane, as well two ex-Family Guy writers, Mike Barker and Matt Weitzman. As a result, this is the only Family Guy episode to have Eddie Kaye Thomas as a voice actor. Also, for the News of the World subplot, it was inspired by series creator Seth MacFarlane's own fear of the cover as a child.

Reception 
The episode received a 2.8 rating and was watched by a total of 5.74 million people, this made it the most watched show on Animation Domination that night, beating The Cleveland Show, Bob's Burgers, American Dad! and The Simpsons with 4.97 million. Kevin McFarland of The A.V. Club gave the episode a B, saying "The cutaways had some laughs, especially the two patter song sequences with Peter mumbling his way through musical numbers, but for the most part this was an average half-hour. That’s better than the norm for late-period Family Guy, which too often forgets things like plot and intertwining stories in favor of cutaways intended to offend. I liked the simplicity of tonight’s half-hour, laughed a few times, and never really groaned at any horrible material. Faint praise to be sure, but it makes the show bearable."

References

External links 

 

2012 American television episodes
Family Guy (season 10) episodes
Queen (band)